Luciano Lebelson Szafir (born 31 December 1968) is a Brazilian businessman, actor, and former model.

Early life
Szafir is the son of Gabriel and Betty Szafir. He has a twin sister named Priscila, an older sister named Alexandra and a younger brother named Salomão. He is also uncle to his twin sister's two children, Júlia and Luís Otávio. Szafir is of Lebanese and Ashkenazi Jewish descent.

Career
Earlier in his career, Szafir worked as a model.  He is the sole actor for Rede Record, and has acted in three novel adaptations for radio.

He was the highlight of the Alliance samba school of Joaçaba-SC in the year 2006, in the pilot called "Taste like a hug."

Personal life
He has a daughter, Sasha Meneghel, with the TV host Xuxa Meneghel, with whom he was in a relationship for 11 years.

He practices martial arts and currently holds a black belt in Brazilian Jiu-Jitsu, a martial art he has practiced since 1978.

Filmography

Television 
 2015 - Os Dez Mandamentos 
 2011 - Rebelde.... Franco Albuquerque
 2009 - Mutantes - Promises of Love.... Amadeus Lamb
 2007 - Love and intrigue.... Felipe Junqueira de Albuquerque
 2006 - Vidas Opostas.... Leonardo Rocha
 2004 - Metamorphoses.... Dr. Lucas
 2001 - O Clone.... Zein
 2001 - Um Anjo Caiu do Céu.... Eduardo
 2000 - Watercolor of Brazil.... Alfredo
 2000 - Uga-Uga.... Pepê
 1998 - Você Decide.... Presenter
 1998 - Labyrinth.... Ivan Sampaio
 1997 - Anjo Mau.... Júlio Malagoni

Film
 2017 - Goitaca.... Maracajaguacu
 2012 - Brave .... Lord MacGuffin (voice)
 2012 - Réquiem para Laura Martin
 2009 - Xuxa in The Mystery of Little Ugliness.... Cinderella's Prince
 2007 - Acerto de Contas
 2007 - Opera Mallandro.... Father of Chico
 2006 - Nightmare Man.... William
 2006 - Women of Brazil.... Murilo
 2006 - Our Lady of Caravaggio.... Comes
 2002 - Xuxa e os Duendes 2 - No Caminho das Fadas
 1998 - Simon and the Slapstick Phantom

References

External links

 
 Sex of Angels 
 Information on the novel A Rose with Love 

1968 births
Living people
Brazilian people of Jewish descent
Brazilian Ashkenazi Jews
Brazilian male models
Brazilian male television actors
Brazilian male telenovela actors
Brazilian male film actors
Brazilian practitioners of Brazilian jiu-jitsu
Male actors from São Paulo
20th-century Brazilian male actors
21st-century Brazilian male actors
Brazilian twins